Phil Longo (born April 17, 1968) is an American football coach who is currently the offensive coordinator for the Wisconsin Badgers. A practitioner of the air raid offense, he was previously the offensive coordinator and quarterbacks coach for North Carolina and Ole Miss.

Early life and playing career
Born in Red Bank, New Jersey and raised in the Bayville section of Berkeley Township, New Jersey, Longo played quarterback at Central Regional High School.

Coaching career
Longo began his coaching career at Parsippany Hills High School in New Jersey, taking over a team that accumulated a .217 winning percentage over the previous 33 years. At the time of his departure, Longo left as the winningest coach in school history while leading them to their first appearance in the New Jersey state playoffs and an undefeated championship season. He accepted an assistant coaching position at William Paterson as the assistant head coach and offensive coordinator in 2000. He left in 2002 to be the associate head coach and offensive coordinator at La Salle, and was named the head coach of the team in 2004. As head coach of La Salle, he compiled a 7–14 record over two years before leaving to accept the offensive coordinator position at Minnesota–Duluth. He joined the coaching staff at Southern Illinois in 2008 as the offensive coordinator. Longo joined the coaching staff at Youngstown State in 2010 as the wide receivers coach and recruiting coordinator. Longo joined the coaching staff at Slippery Rock in 2011 as the wide receivers coach, where his wife Tanya worked as the head coach of the university's women's basketball team. He was promoted to offensive coordinator in 2012, and the team underwent a dramatic change in offense averaging 54.5 points a game.

Sam Houston State
Longo was added to the coaching staff at Sam Houston State in 2014. In his final year at Sam Houston State, Longo's offense was one of the most prolific offenses in FCS, averaging 547 yards a game as the Bearkats went on to a 12–1 record.

Ole Miss
On December 15, 2016, it was reported that Longo was hired to be the new offensive coordinator and quarterbacks coach at the University of Mississippi. Despite averaging over 500 yards of offense per game, his offense was criticized for its inability to score in the red zone and in clutch moments.

North Carolina
Longo was named the offensive coordinator at North Carolina in 2019. In his first three seasons as Tar Heel OC, Longo guided quarterback Sam Howell to multiple school records, and his offense produced multiple 1,000 yard receivers and rushers.

Wisconsin
On December 7th, 2022, it was reported that Longo would be joining Luke Fickell's staff at Wisconsin as the offensive coordinator and QB's coach.

Coaching philosophy
A practitioner of the air raid offense, Longo chose to adopt the offensive system after meeting then-Kentucky offensive coordinator Mike Leach at a coaching clinic in the late 1990s. Unlike the standard air raid offense that is pass-heavy, Longo's offense is designed so that it can be both pass or run oriented, and it's not decided which it is until the game.

Personal life
Longo and his wife, Tanya, have four children.

Head coaching record

College

References

External links
 
 North Carolina profile
 Ole Miss profile
 Slippery Rock profile

1968 births
Living people
American football quarterbacks
American football running backs
East Stroudsburg Warriors football players
La Salle Explorers football coaches
Minnesota Duluth Bulldogs football coaches
North Carolina Tar Heels football coaches
Ole Miss Rebels football coaches
Rowan Profs football players
Sam Houston Bearkats football coaches
Slippery Rock football coaches
Southern Illinois Salukis football coaches
William Paterson Pioneers football coaches
Wisconsin Badgers football coaches
Youngstown State Penguins football coaches
High school football coaches in New Jersey
Central Regional High School alumni
People from Berkeley Township, New Jersey
People from Red Bank, New Jersey
Sportspeople from Ocean County, New Jersey
Coaches of American football from New Jersey
Players of American football from New Jersey